Hygroplasta is a genus of moths in the family Lecithoceridae.

Species
 Hygroplasta atrifasciata Park, 2003
 Hygroplasta canitiana Wu & Park, 1998
 Hygroplasta chunshengi Pathania & Rose, 2004
 Hygroplasta continctella (Walker, 1864)
 Hygroplasta lygaea (Meyrick, 1911)
 Hygroplasta merinxa Wu & Park, 1998
 Hygroplasta monila Wu & Park, 1998
 Hygroplasta monodryas (Meyrick, 1914)
 Hygroplasta notolatra Wu, 1998
 Hygroplasta onyxijuxta Wu & Park, 1998
 Hygroplasta parviella Park, 2003
 Hygroplasta plocioura Park, 2003
 Hygroplasta promyctera Wu & Park, 1998
 Hygroplasta spoliatella (Walker, 1864)
 Hygroplasta utricula Wu & Park, 1998

References

Natural History Museum Lepidoptera genus database

 
Torodorinae
Moth genera
Taxa named by Edward Meyrick